Hellgren is a Swedish surname. Notable people with the surname include:

Claes Hellgren (born 1955), Swedish handball player
Edvin Hellgren
Jens Hellgren (born 1989), Swedish ice hockey player
Martin Hellgren (born 1991), Swedish ice hockey player
•Mike Hellgren, Investigative Reporter at CBS Baltimore  https://www.cbsnews.com/baltimore/personality/mike-hellgren/
Swedish-language surnames